Gherța Mică is a commune of 3,299 inhabitants situated in Satu Mare County, Romania. It is composed of a single village, Gherța Mică.

Natives
 Rodion Markovits
 Maricica Țăran

References

Communes in Satu Mare County